Ger Lynch (born 10 December 1958) is an Irish former Gaelic footballer who played as a wing back at senior level for the Kerry county team.

Lynch made his first appearance for the team during the 1982 championship and became a regular player over subsequent seasons until his retirement in 1989. During that time he won three All-Ireland winners' medals, three Munster winners' medals, one National Football League winners' medal and one All-Star award.

Himself and Tom Spillane — assigned to mark Tommy Conroy and Barney Rock during the 1984 All-Ireland Senior Football Championship Final — began their efforts during the national anthem, which they sang with aplomb. Spillane, quoted in the book Princes of Pigskin, said of this tactic later: "There was no belting but the plot was to sing the National Anthem as loud as we could into their ears to put the fear of God into them. Neither of us were great singers but they must have thought we were wired to the moon".

Lynch has two children: Muireann and Tadhg Lynch.

References

1958 births
Living people
All Stars Awards winners (football)
Gaelic football backs
Irish nurses
Kerry inter-county Gaelic footballers
Munster inter-provincial Gaelic footballers
Psychiatric nurses
Valentia Young Islanders Gaelic footballers
Winners of three All-Ireland medals (Gaelic football)